Kali Charan Suman is an Indian politician and member of the Sixteenth Legislative Assembly of Uttar Pradesh. Suman is a member of the Bahujan Samaj Party and represented Agra Rural constituency of Uttar Pradesh.

Early life and education
Kali Charan Suman was born in the village Ajitapura, Dholpur district, Rajasthan in 1964. Suman belongs to the SC category. He holds M.A. in Sanskrit and B.Ed. degrees (alma mater not known).

Political career
Kali Charan Suman has been a MLA for one term (incumbent). He represents Agra Rural (Assembly constituency) and is a member of the Bahujan Samaj Party.

Posts Held

See also

 Agra Rural
 Uttar Pradesh Legislative Assembly
 16th Legislative Assembly of Uttar Pradesh
 Politics of India
 Bahujan Samaj Party

References

Bahujan Samaj Party politicians from Uttar Pradesh
People from Agra district
Uttar Pradesh MLAs 2012–2017
Living people
1964 births